Radiasteridae is a family of echinoderms belonging to the order Paxillosida.

Genera:
 Betelgeusia Blake & Reid, 1998
 Gephyriaster
 Indiaster Raghavendra Rao, 1957
 Radiaster Perrier, 1881

References

Paxillosida